Komi-Zyryan Autonomous Oblast (Komi: Коми (Зыряна) асвеськӧдлан обласьт, Komi (Zyryana) asves’ködlan oblas’t) created on 22 August 1921. It is one of several autonomous oblasts that existed in the Russian SFSR of the Soviet Union, and it was the predecessor of the Komi ASSR created in 1936. The seat of the Oblast was located in Ust-Sysolsk (renamed "Syktyvkar" in 1930).

References 

1922 establishments in Russia
1936 disestablishments in the Soviet Union
Autonomous oblasts of the Soviet Union
States and territories established in 1922
States and territories disestablished in 1936
History of the Komi Republic